Temptation is a novella by David Brin which was published in 1999 in the anthology Far Horizons: All New Tales from the Greatest Worlds of Science Fiction, ed. by Robert Silverberg

Plot 
This short novella returns to the planet Jijo, setting of the first two books of the Uplift Storm trilogy. At the end of Infinity's Shore, a small group of neodolphins are left on Jijo, those suffering from "stress atavism", a condition wherein the subject reverts to a more primitive state similar to non-uplifted dolphins, as well as medical personnel to oversee them, and others deemed non-essential to Streaker'''s desperate final mission. Additionally, they are to search for Peepoe, a nurse who was abducted by two reverted dolphins, Zhaki and Mopol, who wished to remain on Jijo with her as their unwilling sexual partner. 

Tkett was an archeologist aboard Streaker and is among those that were considered non-essential. He is not suffering from stress atavism, but has a seemingly delusional belief that they may all return to earth some day. Using the dolphin's highly sensitive underwater hearing, he detects the sound of engines and, believing this may be one of the many ancient ships used as decoys during Streaker''s escape from Jijo, goes in pursuit of it accompanied by Chissis, a partially reverted crew mate.

Peepoe also hears the sound of engines deep in the ocean and decides that the time has come for her to make an escape. As she is totally unaware of where she is relative to the dolphin station outside Wuphon Port, the rumbling of the distant engine is the only clue she has as to what direction to travel in. She begins by swimming deep where her captors are less likely to notice her escape, but eventually resorts to a furious sprint across the surface once she detects the sounds of Mopol and Zhaki pursuing her with their powered sled. Exhausted, she comes to a point where she is directly above the engine noise, and she makes a desperate dive down toward it, finding not a spaceship but something that looks like a strange sea monster that grabs her with a tentacle as she loses consciousness. 

Around this same time, Tkett and Chissis encounter the source of the noise they had been pursuing. It’s revealed to be an extremely large cylindrical machine moving across the ocean floor. They enter a hatch and find a strange realm within, where tiny versions of the six races that live on the surface live inside strange semi-transparent cubes, apparently living entirely inside simulations. They see a great many of these cubes in numerous huge chambers within the machine. 

Peepoe awakes in a pool inside the "creature" she encountered, and likewise finds tiny versions of the six races living inside of it, but in this case they live in fanciful villages along the shores of intricate waterways. Each village has an apparent shaman leader that can summon other creatures to defend their people. She eventually encounters a friendly shaman who recognizes her as a dolphin and not a monster. It is explained to both dolphin parties that they have come earlier than expected to these simulations, but they are invited to remain there and live a life of endless adventure and excitement.

A holographic link is used to allow them to speak to one another, and to see that Zhaki and Mopol have already accepted the offer and are awaiting transformation and entry to the simulated worlds. They are told that nobody is forced to enter the simulations, but if they refuse their memory of the encounter will be erased in order to protect the secrecy of the project, which is now revealed to be a plot by the Buyur, the last race to legally inhabit Jijo.

The Buyur foresaw the "Time of Changes" and knew that the galaxy Jijo is in would lose contact with the broader galactic civilization. Their plan is that the descendants of those in the simulations will found an entirely new type of civilization that rejects science in favor of magic and wonder, all provided by the Buyur's machinery.

Tkett is repulsed by the idea and rejects it entirely, while Peepoe argues for accepting it and recruiting as many other dolphins as the can to join them. As they argue the point, Chissis suggests to Tkett that he listen more carefully to what Peepoe is saying, and he realizes there is a hidden sonar message behind her words advising him to "sleep on it".

Tkett awakens sometime later on the surface with the other two dolphins, disoriented to find himself already swimming at a rapid pace. Peepoe explains that she has realized the Buyur had no experience with cetacean brain structures, and would not realize that only one hemisphere of their brain sleeps at a time. Tkett suddenly recalls everything from their encounter, and the three agree they will fight against the plot. Chissis makes remarks that seem to indicate she is ready to return to full sapience with the others.

Characters
(all the main characters are uplifted neodolphins)
Makanee: surgeon from Melbourne-Under
Brookida: older geophysicist
Tkett: archeologist, searches for Peepoe
Zhaki: male dolphin, suffered partial atavism, kidnapped Peepoe with the help of Mopol
Peepoe: nurse,  kidnapped by Zhaki and Mopol
Mopol: male, suffered partial atavism, kidnapped Peepoe with the help of Zhaki
Kaa: pilot and lover of Peepoe who appears to her in a vision as she escapes captivity
Chissis: researcher and pilot, suffering from stress atavism

External links 
"Temptation" on Brin's website
 

American novellas